Casual vacancy may refer to:

 Casual vacancy, in politics, where a seat in a deliberative assembly becomes vacant during that assembly's term
 Casual vacancies in the Australian Parliament
 The Casual Vacancy, a 2012 novel by J. K. Rowling
 The Casual Vacancy (miniseries), based on the book